The 1982 Belgian motorcycle Grand Prix was the seventh round of the 1982 Grand Prix motorcycle racing season. It took place on the weekend of 2–4 July 1982 at the Circuit de Spa-Francorchamps.

Classification

500 cc

References

Belgian motorcycle Grand Prix
Motorcycle Grand Prix
Belgian